Resacralization is the process of reviving religion or restoring spiritual meanings to various domains of life and thought. It has been termed as the "alter ego" of secularization, which is "a theory claiming that religion loses its holds in modern society". The term rescralization has a variety of connotations in sociology of religion and "very largely draws its meaning" from secularization thesis. According to this viewpoint, religion and spiritual values continue to play an important role in both the private and public realms. Empirical evidence suggests that the world is undergoing a rescralization since religions are gaining ground in contemporary social and political spheres.

Causes
The idea of rescralization has been used to challenge the Weberian presumption that modernization inevitably breeds disenchantment and secular values and, in the end, harms religion. This point of view contends that modernity, rather than eliminating religion, creates new possibilities for its revival in a variety of fields. "The most salient cause of rescralisation", according to The SAGE Encyclopedia of the Sociology of Religion, "is precisely what was supposed to eradicate religion: the social, economic, and cultural modernisation that swept across the world". In a world where "traditional and local knowledge and systems of authority are disrupted and society becomes ever more complex", individuals seek rescralization because they "need new sources of identity and new forms of stable community to provide them with a sense of meaning and purpose".

Aspects

Resacralization of knowledge

Resacralization of nature

See also
 Desecularization

References

Further reading

External links
“Some Metaphysical Principles Pertaining to Nature”, a lecture by Seyyed Hossein Nasr.
“The Rape of Nature”, an article by Philip Sherrard.

Sociology of religion